William Waterhouse may refer to:

William Waterhouse (bassoonist) (1931–2007), English bassoonist, musicologist and academic
William Waterhouse (violinist) (1917–2003), Canadian violinist
William C. Waterhouse (1941–2016), American mathematician
Bill Waterhouse (1922–2019), Australian bookmaker, businessman and former barrister
William Glenn Waterhouse, American Olympic sailor

See also
John William Waterhouse (1849–1917), English painter
William H. Waterhouse House, Florida